Zachary J. Schreiber (born June 24, 1982 in Cedar Rapids, Iowa) is a former baseball pitcher.

Schreiber attended Duke University and played baseball there for 4 years. Following his senior season, he was drafted by the Atlanta Braves in the 16th round (491st overall) in the 2004 Major League Baseball draft.

He began his professional career for the Gulf Coast Braves in 2004, pitching in 3 games, but did not factor into a decision through the three games in his first professional season. In 2005, he went 1-3 with a 2.94 ERA through 27 games for Rome and had a 0-2 record with a 2.84 ERA through 15 games for Myrtle Beach.  His 2005 combined record was 1-5 with a 2.89 ERA.

In 2006, he led all Mississippi Braves' pitchers with 21 saves and led all relievers by holding opponents to a .187 average after his promotion to AA Mississippi from High-A Myrtle Beach on May 7. Schreiber was 20-22 in save opportunities on the season and he recorded a save in 11 of his last 14 outings and in 13 of the last 17 trips to the hill.  He was named to the 2006 Southern League midseason All-Star team.

He pitched in 34 games for AAA Richmond earning a 2.97 ERA with 6 saves. On November 20, 2007, the Braves added Schreiber to the 40 man roster, protecting him from the Rule 5 Draft. In April 2008, he was designated for assignment. In 2008, he pitched for Richmond.   He was released from the Braves organization in late March 2009 and signed by the Los Angeles Dodgers in mid April 2009. He made his debut in the Dodgers organization with the Inland Empire 66ers of San Bernardino in July and quickly was promoted to the Chattanooga Lookouts. He became a free agent after the 2009 season.

References

External links
 The Baseball Cube Player Profile
 MLB.com Player Profile

1982 births
Living people
Sportspeople from Cedar Rapids, Iowa
Gulf Coast Braves players
Rome Braves players
Myrtle Beach Pelicans players
Mississippi Braves players
Richmond Braves players
Inland Empire 66ers of San Bernardino players
Chattanooga Lookouts players